Trebizond Gospel, ℓ 243 (in the Gregory-Aland numbering), is a Byzantine illuminated manuscript with the text of Gospel Lectionary, dating palaeographically to the 11th century with 15 parchment leaves (33 by 36.5 cm) from the 10th century or earlier.

Description 

The text is written in two columns per page, 18 lines per page in uncial letters. It contains 15 pictures. 

The book was richly decorated with gold and jewels by the Trapezuntine Emperor Andronicus. In 1858, the Trebizond Gospel was presented by the Orthodox Metropolitan of Trebizond to the Emperor Alexander II of Russia, who donated it to the Russian National Library, where is held to the present day (Codex Gr. 21, 21a).

It was examined and described by Eduard de Muralt.

The manuscript is not cited in the critical editions of the Greek New Testament (UBS3), because of its small textual value.

See also 

 List of New Testament lectionaries
 Lectionary 244
 Lectionary 245

References

Further reading 
 Eduard de Muralt, Catalogue des manuscrits grecs de la Bibliothèque Impériale publique (Petersburg 1864), pp. 40–41.
 Likhachova V. D., Byzantine miniature, Moscow: Iskusstvo Art Publishers 1977, p. 14.

External links  
 Digitized copy at the Walters Art Museum
 Russian National Library
 Trebizond Gospel at the Russian National Library

Gospel Books
Empire of Trebizond
Tourist attractions in Saint Petersburg
History of Trabzon
Greek New Testament lectionaries
National Library of Russia collection
10th-century illuminated manuscripts
Illuminated biblical manuscripts
Byzantine illuminated manuscripts